John Alfred Thomas Horn (6 November 1931 – 26 August 2001) was a British tennis player who won the Wimbledon Boys' singles Championship in 1950.

Tennis career
Horn reached the Wimbledon Boys' Singles final for two years running.  In the 1949 final he lost to Staffan Stockenberg and in 1950 he beat the Egyptian player, Kamel Moubarek in the final.

Horn competed on the amateur circuit during the 1950s and won 23 titles. His first title was as an eighteen-year-old, at the Derbyshire championships in Buxton, when he beat George Godsell in the final. His last amateur title was in 1956 at the North of England Hardcourts, beating Michael Hann in the final. Horn turned professional in the late 1950s and in 1967 he won the British Pro Championships held at Eastbourne with a victory over Charles Applewhaite.

Horn's best result at a Grand Slam events was reaching the third round at the 1952 Wimbledon Championships, before losing to Budge Patty. After retiring as a player, Horn worked as a tennis coach in Ireland, spending many years coaching at Rathdown School.

Junior Grand Slam finals

Singles: 2 (1 win – 1 loss)

References

External links
 

1931 births
2001 deaths
British male tennis players
Wimbledon junior champions
Grand Slam (tennis) champions in boys' singles
People from Plaistow, Newham
Tennis people from Greater London
Professional tennis players before the Open Era
English male tennis players